Ireland has been labelled as a tax haven or corporate tax haven in multiple financial reports, an allegation which the state has rejected in response. Ireland does not meet the 1998 OECD definition of a tax haven, but no OECD member, including Switzerland, ever met this definition; only Trinidad & Tobago met it in 2017. Similarly, no EU–28 country is amongst the 64 listed in the 2017 EU tax haven blacklist and greylist. 
In September 2016, Brazil became the first G20 country to "blacklist" Ireland as a tax haven.

Ireland's base erosion and profit shifting (BEPS) tools give some foreign corporates  of 0% to 2.5% on global profits re-routed to Ireland via their tax treaty network. Ireland's aggregate  for foreign corporates is 2.2–4.5%. Ireland's BEPS tools are the world's largest BEPS flows, exceed the entire Caribbean system, and artificially inflate the US–EU trade deficit. Ireland's tax-free QIAIF & L–QIAIF regimes, and Section 110 SPVs, enable foreign investors to avoid Irish taxes on Irish assets, and can be combined with Irish BEPS tools to create confidential routes out of the Irish corporate tax system. As these structures are OECD–whitelisted, Ireland's laws and regulations allow the use of data protection and data privacy provisions, and opt-outs from filing of public accounts, to obscure their effects.

Ireland's situation is attributed to  arising from the historical U.S. "worldwide" corporate tax system, which has made U.S. multinationals the largest users of tax havens, and BEPS tools, in the world.  The U.S. Tax Cuts and Jobs Act of 2017 ("TCJA"), and move to a hybrid "territorial" tax system, removed the need for some of these compromises. In 2018, IP–heavy S&P500 multinationals guided similar post-TCJA effective tax rates, whether they are legally based in the U.S. (e.g. Pfizer), or Ireland (e.g. Medtronic). While TCJA neutralised some Irish BEPS tools, it enhanced others (e.g. Apple's "CAIA"). A reliance on U.S. corporates (80% of Irish corporation tax, 25% of Irish labour, 25 of top 50 Irish firms, and 57% of Irish value-add), is a concern in Ireland.

Ireland's weakness in attracting corporates from "territorial" tax systems (Table 1), was apparent in its failure to attract material financial services jobs moving due to Brexit (e.g. no US investment banks or material financial services franchise). Ireland's diversification into full tax haven tools (e.g. QIAIF, L–QIAIF, and ICAV), has seen tax-law firms, and offshore magic circle firms, set up Irish offices to handle Brexit-driven tax restructuring. These tools made Ireland the world's 3rd largest Shadow Banking OFC, and 5th largest Conduit OFC.

Context

Ireland has been associated with the term "tax haven" since the U.S. IRS produced a list on the 12 January 1981.  Ireland has been a consistent feature on almost every non-governmental tax haven list from Hines in February 1994, to Zucman in June 2018 (and each one in-between). However, Ireland has never been considered a tax haven by either the OECD or the EU Commission.  These two contrasting facts are used by various sides, to allegedly prove or disprove that Ireland is a tax haven, and much of the detail in-between is discarded, some of which can explain the EU and OCED's position. Confusing scenarios have emerged, for example:

 In April 2000, the FSF–IMF listed Ireland as an offshore financial centre ("OFC"), based on criteria which academics and the OECD support. The Irish State has never refuted the OFC label, and there are Irish State documents that note Ireland as an OFC. Yet, the terms OFC and "tax haven" are often considered synonymous.
However, the same Commissioner in January 2018, described Ireland to the EU Parliament as a tax black hole.
 In September 2018, the 29th Chair of the U.S. President's Council of Economic Advisors, tax-expert Kevin Hassett, said that: "It’s not Ireland’s fault U.S. tax law was written by someone on acid". Hassett, however, had labelled Ireland as a tax haven in November 2017, when advocating for the Tax Cuts and Jobs Act of 2017 ("TCJA").

The next sections chronicle the detail regarding Ireland's label as a tax haven (most cited Sources and Evidence), and detail regarding the Irish State's official Rebuttals of the label (both technical and non-technical). The final section chronicles the academic research on the drivers of U.S., EU, and OCED, decision making regarding Ireland.

Labels

Ireland has been labelled a tax haven, or a corporate tax haven (or Conduit OFC), by:

Ireland has also been labelled related terms to being a tax haven:

The term tax haven has been used by the Irish mainstream media and leading Irish commentators.  Irish elected TDs have asked the question: "Is Ireland a tax haven?". A search of Dáil Éireann debates lists 871 references to the term.  Some established Irish political parties accuse the Irish State of tax haven activities.

OECD plans
While Ireland has been considered a tax haven by many for decades, the global tax system that Ireland depends on to incentivize multinational corporations to move there is receiving an overhaul by a coalition of 130 nations. This would cause changes to Ireland’s official corporate tax rate of 12.5%, and the associated rules sometimes described as helping companies based there avoid paying taxes to other countries where they make profits. Originally Ireland was one of the few countries (one of nine) to oppose signing up for reform to a global minimum corporate tax rate of 15% and to force technology and retail companies to pay taxes based on where their goods and services were sold, rather than where the company was located. The Irish government would eventually agree to the terms of the deal after some debate. As of October 7, 2021 Ireland dropped its opposition too an overhaul of global corporate tax rules giving up its 12.5% tax rate. The Irish Cabinet approved an increase from 12.5% to 15% in corporation tax for companies with turnover in excess of 750 million euros. Additionally, the Irish Department of Finance has estimated that joining this global deal would reduce the country’s tax take by 2 billion euros ($2.3 billion) a year, according to RTE. The other countries party to this deal did have to agree to compromise on a few key issues involved in the reform, dropping the “at least” in the statement “minimum corporate tax rate of at least 15%” updating it to just 15% — signaling that the rate would not be pushed up at a later date. Ireland was also given assurances that it could keep the lower rate for smaller firms located in the country.

Evidence

Global U.S. BEPS hub

Ireland ranks in all non-political "tax haven lists" going back to the first lists in 1994, and features in all "proxy tests" for tax havens and "quantitative measures" of tax havens. The level of base erosion and profit shifting (BEPS) by U.S. multinationals in Ireland is so large, that in 2017 the Central Bank of Ireland abandoned GDP/GNP as a statistic to replace it with Modified gross national income (GNI*).  Economists note that Ireland's distorted GDP is now distorting the EU's aggregate GDP, and has artificially inflated the trade-deficit between the EU and the US. (see Table 1).

Ireland's IP–based BEPS tools use "intellectual property" ("IP") to "shift profits" from higher-tax locations, with whom Ireland has bilateral tax treaties, back to Ireland.  Once in Ireland, these tools reduce Irish corporate taxes by re-routing to say Bermuda with the Double Irish BEPS tool (e.g. as Google and Facebook did), or to Malta with the Single Malt BEPS tool (e.g. as Microsoft and Allergan did), or by writing-off internally created virtual assets against Irish corporate tax with the Capital Allowances for Intangible Assets ("CAIA") BEPS tool (e.g. as Apple did post 2015). These BEPS tools give an Irish corporate effective tax rate (ETR) of 0–2.5%. They are the world's largest BEPS tools, and exceed the aggregate flows of the Caribbean tax system.

Ireland has received the most U.S. corporate tax inversions of any global jurisdiction, or tax haven, since the first U.S. tax inversion in 1983.

While IP–based BEPS tools are the majority of Irish BEPS flows, they were developed from Ireland's traditional expertise in inter-group contract manufacturing, or transfer pricing–based (TP) BEPS tools (e.g. capital allowance schemes, inter-group cross-border charging), which still provide material employment in Ireland (e.g. from U.S. life sciences firms).  Some corporates like Apple maintain expensive Irish contract manufacturing TP–based BEPS operations (versus  cheaper options in Asia, like Apple's Foxconn), to give "substance" to their larger Irish IP–based BEPS tools.

By refusing to implement the 2013 EU Accounting Directive (and invoking exemptions on reporting holding company structures until 2022), Ireland enables their TP and IP–based BEPS tools to structure as "unlimited liability companies" ("ULC") which do not have to file public accounts with the Irish CRO.

Ireland's Debt–based BEPS tools (e.g. the Section 110 SPV), have made Ireland the 3rd largest global Shadow Banking OFC, and have been used by Russian banks to circumvent sanctions. Irish Section 110 SPVs offer "orphaning" to protect the identity of the owner, and to shield the owner from Irish tax (the Section 110 SPV is an Irish company). They were used by U.S. distressed debt funds to avoid billions in Irish taxes, assisted by Irish tax-law firms using in-house Irish children's charities to complete the orphan structure, that enabled the U.S. distressed debt funds to export the gains on their Irish assets, free of any Irish taxes or duties, to Luxembourg and the Caribbean (see Section 110 abuse).

Unlike the TP and IP–based BEPS tools, Section 110 SPVs must file public accounts with the Irish CRO, which was how the above abuses were discovered in 2016–17. In February 2018 the Central Bank of Ireland upgraded the little-used L–QIAIF regime to give the same tax benefits as Section 110 SPVs but without having to file public accounts. In June 2018, the Central Bank reported that €55 billion of U.S.–owned distressed Irish assets, equivalent to 25% of Irish GNI*, moved out of Irish Section 110 SPVs and into L–QIAIFs.

Green Jersey BEPS tool

Apple's Q1 2015 Irish restructure, post their €13 billion EU tax fine for 2004–2014, is one of the most advanced OECD-compliant BEPS tools in the world. It integrates Irish IP–based BEPS tools, and Jersey Debt–based BEPS tools, to materially amplify the tax sheltering effects, by a factor of circa 2.  Apple Ireland bought circa $300 billion of a "virtual" IP–asset from Apple Jersey in Q1 2015 (see leprechaun economics).  The Irish "capital allowances for intangible assets" ("CAIA") BEPS tool allows Apple Ireland to write-off this virtual IP–asset against future Irish corporation tax. The €26.220 billion jump in intangible capital allowances claimed in 2015,  showed Apple Ireland is writing-off this IP–asset over a 10–year period. In addition, Apple Jersey gave Apple Ireland the $300 billion "virtual" loan to buy this virtual IP–asset from Apple Jersey. Thus, Apple Ireland can claim additional Irish corporation tax relief on this loan interest, which is circa $20 billion per annum (Apple Jersey pays no tax on the loan interest it receives from Apple Ireland). These tools, created entirely from virtual internal assets financed by virtual internal loans, give Apple circa €45 billion per annum in relief against Irish corporation tax.  In June 2018 it was shown that Microsoft is preparing to copy this Apple scheme, known as "the Green Jersey".

As the IP is a virtual internal asset, it can be replenished with each technology (or life sciences) product cycle (e.g. new virtual IP assets created offshore and then bought by the Irish subsidiary, with internal virtual loans, for higher prices). The Green Jersey thus gives a perpetual BEPS tool, like the double Irish, but at a much greater scale than the double Irish, as the full BEPS effect is capitalised on day one.

Experts expect the U.S Tax Cuts and Jobs Act of 2017 ("TCJA") GILTI-regime to neutralise some Irish BEPS tools, including the single malt and the double Irish.  Because Irish intangible capital allowances are accepted as U.S. GILTI deductions, the "Green Jersey" now enables U.S. multinationals to achieve net effective U.S. corporate tax rates of 0% to 2.5% via TCJA's participation relief. As Microsoft's main Irish BEPS tools are the single malt and the double Irish, in June 2018, Microsoft was preparing a "Green Jersey" Irish BEPS scheme.  Irish experts, including Seamus Coffey, Chairman of the Irish Fiscal Advisory Council and author of the Irish State's 2017 Review of Ireland's Corporation Tax Code, expects a boom in U.S. on-shoring of virtual internal IP assets to Ireland, via the Green Jersey BEPS tool (e.g. under the capital allowances for intangible assets scheme).

Domestic tax tools

Ireland's Qualifying Investor Alternative Investment Fund ("QIAIF") regime is a range of five tax-free legal wrappers (ICAV, Investment Company, Unit Trust, Common Contractual Fund, Investment Limited Partnership).  Four of the five wrappers do not file public accounts with the Irish CRO, and therefore offer tax confidentiality and tax secrecy.  While they are regulated by the Central Bank of Ireland, like the Section 110 SPV, it has been shown many are effectively unregulated "brass plate" entities. The Central Bank has no mandate to investigate tax avoidance or tax evasion, and under the 1942 Central Bank Secrecy Act, the Central Bank of Ireland cannot send the confidential information which QIAIFs must file with the Bank to the Irish Revenue.

QIAIFs have been used in tax avoidance on Irish assets, on circumventing international regulations,  on avoiding tax laws in the EU and the U.S.  QIAIFs can be combined with Irish corporate BEPS tools (e.g. the Orphaned Super–QIF), to create routes out of the Irish corporate tax system to Luxembourg, the main Sink OFC for Ireland. It is asserted that a material amount of assets in Irish QIAIFs, and the ICAV wrapper in particular, are Irish assets being shielded from Irish taxation.  Offshore magic circle law firms (e.g. Walkers and Maples and Calder, who have set up offices in Ireland), market the Irish ICAV as a superior wrapper to the Cayman SPC (Maples and Calder claim to be a major architect of the ICAV), and there are explicit QIAIF rules to help with re-domiciling of Cayman/BVI funds into Irish ICAVs.

Captured state

There is evidence Ireland meets the captured state criteria for tax havens.  When the EU investigated Apple in Ireland in 2016 they found private tax rulings from the Irish Revenue giving Apple a tax rate of 0.005% on over EUR€110 billion of cumulative Irish profits from 2004 to 2014.  

When the Irish Finance Minister Michael Noonan was alerted by an Irish MEP in 2016 to a new Irish BEPS tool to replace the Double Irish (called the Single Malt), he was told to "put on the green jersey". When Apple executed the largest BEPS transaction in history in Q1 2015, the Central Statistics Office suppressed data to hide Apple's identity.  

Noonan changed the capital allowances for intangible assets scheme rules, the IP–based BEPS tool Apple used in Q1 2015, to reduce Apple's effective tax rate from 2.5% to 0%. When it was discovered in 2016 that U.S. distressed debt funds abused Section 110 SPVs to shield €80 billion in Irish loan balances from Irish taxes, the Irish State did not investigate or prosecute (see Section 110 abuse). In February 2018, the Central Bank of Ireland, which regulates Section 110 SPVs, upgraded the little used tax-free L-QIAIF regime, which has stronger privacy from public scrutiny. In June 2018, U.S. distressed debt funds transferred €55 billion of Irish assets (or 25% of Irish GNI*), out of Section 110 SPVs and into L–QIAIFs.

The June 2017 OECD Anti-BEPS MLI was signed by 70 jurisdictions. The corporate tax havens, including Ireland, opted out of the key Article 12.

Tax haven investigator Nicholas Shaxson documented how Ireland's captured state uses a complex and "siloed" network of Irish privacy and data protection laws to navigate around the fact that its tax tools are OECD–whitelisted, and therefore must be transparent to some State entity.   For example, Irish tax-free QIAIFs (and L–QIAIFs) are regulated by the Central Bank of Ireland and must provide the Bank with details of their financials. However, the 1942 Central Bank Secrecy Act prevents the Central Bank from sending this data to the Revenue Commissioners. Similarly, the Central Statistics Office (Ireland) stated it had to restrict its public data release in 2016–17 to protect the Apple's identity during its 2015 BEPS action, because the 1993 Central Statistics Act prohibits use of economic data for revealing such activities.  When the EU Commission fined Apple €13 billion for illegal State aid in 2016, there were no official records of any discussion of the tax deal given to Apple outside of the Irish Revenue Commissioners as such data is also protected.  

When Tim Cook stated in 2016 that Apple was the largest tax-payer in Ireland, the Irish Revenue Commissioners quoted Section 815A of the 1997 Tax Acts that prevents them disclosing such information, even to members of Dáil Éireann, or the Irish Department of Finance (despite the fact that Apple is circa one-fifth of Ireland's GDP).

Commentators note the plausible deniability provided by Irish privacy and data protection laws, that enable the State to function as a tax haven while maintaining OECD compliance. They ensure the State entity regulating each tax tool are "siloed" from the Irish Revenue, and public scrutiny via FOI laws.

In February 2019, The Guardian reported on leaked Facebook internal reports revealing the influence Facebook had on the Irish State, to which Cambridge University academic John Naughton stated: "the leak was “explosive” in the way it revealed the “vassalage” of the Irish state to the big tech companies".  In April 2019, Politico reported on concerns that Ireland was protecting Facebook and Google from the new EU GDPR regulations, stating: "Despite its vows to beef up its threadbare regulatory apparatus, Ireland has a long history of catering to the very companies it is supposed to oversee, having wooed top Silicon Valley firms to the Emerald Isle with promises of low taxes, open access to top officials, and help securing funds to build glittering new headquarters."

Rebuttals

Effective tax rates

The Irish State refutes tax haven labels as unfair criticism of its low, but legitimate, 12.5% Irish corporate tax rate, which it defends as being the effective tax rate ("ETR").  Independent studies show that Ireland's aggregate effective corporate tax rate is between 2.2% to 4.5% (depending on assumptions made).  This lower aggregate effective tax rate is consistent with the individual effective tax rates of U.S. multinationals in Ireland (U.S.–controlled multinationals are 14 of Ireland's largest 20 companies, and Apple alone is over one-fifth of Irish GDP; see "low tax economy"), as well as the IP–based BEPS tools openly marketed by the main tax-law firms in the Irish International Financial Services Centre with ETRs of 0–2.5%  (see "effective tax rate").

Two of the world's main , estimated Ireland's effective corporate tax rate to be 4%: James R. Hines Jr. in his 1994 Hines–Rice paper on tax havens, estimated Ireland's effective corporate rate was 4% (Appendix 4); Gabriel Zucman, 24 years later, in his June 2018 paper on corporate tax havens, also estimated Ireland's effective corporate tax to be 4% (Appendix 1).

The disconnect between the ETR of 12.5% claimed by the Irish State and its advisors, and the actual ETRs of 2.2–4.5% calculated by independent experts, is because the Irish tax code considers a high percentage of Irish income as not being subject to Irish taxation, due to various exclusions and deductions. The gap of 12.5% vs. 2.2–4.5% implies that well over two-thirds of corporate profits booked in Ireland are excluded from Irish corporate taxation (see Irish ETR).

The Irish State does not refer to QIAIFs (or L–QIAIFs), or Section 110 SPVs, which allow non-resident investors to hold Irish assets indefinitely without incurring Irish taxes, VAT or duties (e.g. permanent "base erosion" to the Irish exchequer as QIAIF units and SPV shares can be traded), and which can be combined with Irish BEPS tools to avoid all Irish corporate taxation (see ).

Salary taxes, VAT, and CGT for Irish residents are in line with rates of other EU–28 countries, and tend to be slightly higher than EU–28 averages in many cases. Because of this, Ireland has a special lower salary tax rate scheme, and other tax bonuses, for employees of foreign multinationals earning over €75,000 ("SARP").

The OECD's "Hierarchy of Taxes" pyramid (from the Department of Finance Tax Strategy Group's 2011 tax policy document) summarises Ireland's tax strategy.

OECD 1998 definition

EU and U.S. studies that attempted to find a consensus on the definition of a tax haven, have concluded that there is no consensus (see tax haven definitions).

The Irish State, and its advisors, have refuted the tax haven label by invoking the 1998 OCED definition of a "tax haven" as the consensus definition:

Most Irish BEPS tools and QIAIFs are OECD–whitelisted (and can thus avail of Ireland's 70 bilateral tax treaties), and therefore while Ireland could meet the first OECD test, it fails the second and third OECD tests.  The fourth OECD test (‡) was withdrawn by the OECD in 2002 on protest from the U.S., which indicates is a political dimension to the definition.  In 2017, only one jurisdiction, Trinidad & Tobago, met the 1998 OECD definition of a tax haven (Trinidad & Tobago is not one of the 35 OECD member countries), and the definition has fallen into disrepute.

Tax haven academic James R. Hines Jr. notes that OECD tax haven lists never include the 35 OECD member countries (Ireland is a founding OECD member).  The OECD definition was produced in 1998 as part of the OECD's investigation into Harmful Tax Competition: An Emerging Global Issue.  By 2000, when the OECD published their first list of 35 tax havens,  it included no OECD member countries as they were now all considered to have engaged in the OECD's Global Forum on Transparency and Exchange of Information for Tax Purposes (see ). Because the OECD has never listed any of its 35 members as tax havens, Ireland, Luxembourg, the Netherlands and Switzerland are sometimes referred to as the "OECD tax havens".

Subsequent definitions of tax haven, and/or offshore financial centre/corporate tax haven (see definition of a "tax haven"), focus on effective taxes as the primary requirement, which Ireland would meet, and have entered the general lexicon.  The Tax Justice Network, who places Ireland on its tax haven list, split the concept of tax rates from tax transparency by defining a secrecy jurisdiction and creating the Financial Secrecy Index. The OECD has never updated or amended its 1998 definition (apart from dropping the 4th criteria). The Tax Justice Network imply the U.S. may be the reason.

EU 2017 tax haven lists

While by 2017, the OECD only considered Trinidad and Tobago to be a tax haven, in 2017 the EU produced a list of 17 tax havens, plus another 47 jurisdictions on the "grey list", however, as with the OECD lists above, the EU list did not include any EU-28 jurisdictions.  Only one of the EU's 17 blacklisted tax havens, namely Samoa, appeared in the July 2017 Top 20 tax havens list from CORPNET.

The EU Commission was criticised for not including Ireland, Luxembourg, the Netherlands, Malta and Cyprus, and Pierre Moscovici, explicitly stated to an Irish State Oireachtas Finance Committee on 24 January 2017: Ireland is not a tax haven, although he subsequently called Ireland and the Netherlands "tax black holes" on 18 January 2018.

On 27 March 2019, RTÉ News reported that the European Parliament had "overwhelmingly accepted" a new report that likened Ireland to a tax haven.

Hines–Rice 1994 definition

The first major  was James R. Hines Jr., who in 1994, published a paper with Eric M Rice, listing 41 tax havens, of which Ireland was one of their major 7 tax havens.  The 1994 Hines–Rice paper is recognised as the first important paper on tax havens, and is the most cited paper in the history of research on tax havens.  The paper has been cited by all subsequent, most cited, research papers on tax havens, by other , including Desai, Dharmapala, Slemrod, and Zucman.  Hines expanded his original 1994 list to 45 countries in 2007, and to 52 countries in the Hines 2010 list, and used quantitative techniques to estimate that Ireland was the third largest global tax haven. Other major papers on tax havens by Dharmapala (2008, 2009), and Zucman (2015, 2018), cite the 1994 Hines–Rice paper, but create their own tax haven lists, all of which include Ireland (e.g., the June 2018, Zucman–Tørsløv–Wier 2018 list).

The 1994 Hines–Rice paper was one of the first to use the term "profit shifting".  Hines–Rice also introduced the first quantitative tests of a tax haven, which Hines felt were needed as many tax havens had non-trivial "headline" tax rates.  These two tests are still the most widely quoted proxy tests for tax havens in the academic literature. The first test, extreme distortion of national accounts by BEPS accounting flows, was used by the IMF in June 2000 when defining offshore financial centres ("OFCs"), a term the IMF used to capture both traditional tax havens and emerging modern corporate tax havens:

The Hines–Rice paper showed that low foreign tax rates [from tax havens] ultimately enhance U.S. tax collections.  Hines' insight that the U.S. is the largest beneficiary from tax havens was confirmed by others, and dictated U.S. policy towards tax havens, including the 1996 "check-the-box" rules, and U.S. hostility to OECD attempts in curbing Ireland's BEPS tools.  Under the 2017 U.S. TCJA, U.S. multinationals paid a 15.5% repatriation tax on the circa $1 trillion in untaxed cash built up in global tax havens from 2004 to 2017.  Had these U.S. multinationals paid foreign taxes, they would have built up sufficient foreign tax credits to avoid paying U.S. taxes. By allowing U.S. multinationals to use global tax havens, the U.S. exchequer received more taxes, at the expense of other countries, as Hines predicted in 1994.

Several of Hines' papers on tax havens, including the calculations of the Hines–Rice 1994 paper, were used in the final report by the U.S. President's Council of Economic Advisors that justified the U.S. Tax Cuts and Jobs Act of 2017, the largest U.S. tax reform in a generation.

The Irish State dismisses academic studies which list Ireland as a tax haven as being "out-of-date", because they cite the 1994 Hines–Rice paper.  The Irish State ignores the fact that both Hines, and all the other academics, developed new lists; or that the Hines–Rice 1994 paper is still considered correct (e.g. per the 2017 U.S. TCJA legislation).  In 2013, the Department of Finance (Ireland) co-wrote a paper with the Irish Revenue Commissioners, which they had published in the State-sponsored ESRI Quarterly, which found the only sources listing Ireland as a tax haven were:

The following is from a June 2018 Irish Independent article by the CEO of the key trade body that represents all U.S. multinationals in Ireland on the 1994 Hines–Rice paper:

Unique talent base

In a less technical manner to the rebuttals by the Irish State, the labels have also drawn responses from leaders in the Irish business community who attribute the value of U.S. investment in Ireland to Ireland's unique talent base. At €334 billion, the value of U.S. investment in Ireland is larger than Ireland's 2016 GDP of €291 billion (or 2016 GNI* of €190 billion), and larger than total aggregate U.S. investment into all BRIC countries.  This unique talent base is also noted by IDA Ireland, the State body responsible for attracting inward investment, but never defined beyond the broad concept.

Irish education does not appear to be distinctive.  Ireland has a high % of third-level graduates, but this is because it re-classified many technical colleges into degree-issuing institutions in 2005–08. This is believed to have contributed to the decline of its leading universities, of which there are two in the top 200 (i.e. a quality over quantity issue).  Ireland continues to pursue this strategy and is considering re-classifying the remaining Irish technical institutes as universities for 2019.

Ireland shows no apparent distinctiveness in any non-tax related metrics of business competitiveness including cost of living, league tables of favoured EU FDI locations, league tables of favoured EU destinations for London-based financials post-Brexit (which are linked to quality of talent), and the key World Economic Forum Global Competitiveness Report rankings.

Irish commentators provide a perspective on Ireland's "talent base". The State applies an "employment tax" to U.S. multinationals using Irish BEPs tools. To fulfil their Irish employment quotas, some U.S. technology firms perform low-grade localisation functions in Ireland which requires foreign employees speaking global languages (while many U.S. multinationals perform higher-value software engineering functions in Ireland, some do not). These employees must be sourced internationally. This is facilitated via a loose Irish work-visa programme.  This Irish "employment tax" requirement for use of BEPS tools, and its fulfilment via foreign work-visas, is a driver of Dublin's housing crisis.  This is consistent with a bias to property development-led economic growth, favoured by the main Irish political parties (see Abuse of QIAIFs).

Global "knowledge hub" for "selling into Europe"

In another less technical rebuttal, the State explains Ireland's high ranking in the established "proxy tests" for tax havens as a by–product of Ireland's position as preferred hub for global "knowledge economy" multinationals (e.g. technology and life sciences), "selling into EU–28 markets".  When the Central Statistics Office (Ireland) suppressed its 2016–2017 data release to protect Apple's Q1 2015 BEPS action, it released a paper on "meeting the challenges of a modern globalised knowledge economy".

Ireland has no foreign corporates that are non–U.S./non–UK in its top 50 companies by revenue, and only one by employees (German Lidl, which sells into Ireland).  The UK multinationals in Ireland are either selling into Ireland (e.g. Tesco), or date pre–2009, after which the UK overhauled its tax system to a "territorial tax" model. Since 2009, the U.K has become a major tax haven (see U.K. transformation). Since this transformation, no major UK firms have moved to Ireland and most UK corporate tax inversions to Ireland returned; although Ireland has succeeded in attracting some financial services firms affected by Brexit.

In 2016, U.S. corporate tax expert, James R. Hines Jr., showed multinationals from "territorial" corporate taxation systems don't need tax havens, when researching behaviours of German multinationals with German academic tax experts.

U.S.–controlled multinationals constitute 25 of the top 50 Irish firms (including tax inversions), and 70% of top 50 revenue (see Table 1). U.S.–controlled multinations pay 80% of Irish corporate taxes (see "low tax economy"). Irish–based U.S. multinationals may be selling into Europe, however, the evidence is that they route all non–U.S. business through Ireland.  Ireland is more accurately described as a "U.S. corporate tax haven".  The U.S. multinationals in Ireland are from "knowledge industries" (see Table 1). This is because Ireland's BEPS tools (e.g. the double Irish, the single malt and the capital allowances for intangible assets) require intellectual property ("IP") to execute the BEPS actions, which technology and life sciences possess in quantity (see IP–Based BEPS tools).

Rather than a "global knowledge hub" for "selling into Europe", it might be suggested that Ireland is a base for U.S. multinationals with sufficient IP to use Ireland's BEPS tools to shield non–U.S. revenues from U.S. taxation.

In 2018, the U.S. converted into a hybrid "territorial" tax system (the U.S. was one of the last remaining pure "worldwide" tax systems).  Post this conversion, U.S. effective tax rates for IP–heavy U.S. multinationals are very similar to the effective tax rates they would incur if legally headquartered in Ireland, even net of full Irish BEPS tools like the double Irish. This represents a substantive challenge to the Irish economy (see effect of U.S. Tax Cuts and Jobs Act).  However,  mean some Irish BEPS tools, such as Apple's , have been enhanced.

Ireland's recent expansion into traditional tax haven services (e.g. Cayman Island and Luxembourg type ICAVs and L–QIAIFs) is a diversifier from U.S. corporate tax haven services.  Brexit was initially disappointing for Ireland in the area of attracting financial services firms from London, but the situation later improved. Brexit has led to growth in UK centric tax-law firms (including offshore magic circle firms), setting up offices in Ireland to handle traditional tax haven services for clients.

Countermeasures

Background

Apparent contradictions

While Ireland's development into traditional tax haven tools (e.g. ICAVs and L–QIAIFs) is more recent, Ireland's status as a corporate tax haven has been noted since 1994 (the first Hines–Rice tax haven paper), and discussed in the U.S. Congress for a decade.  A lack of progress, and delays, in addressing Ireland's corporate tax BEPS tools is apparent:

Source of contradictions

Tax haven experts explain these contradictions as resulting from the different agendas of the major OECD taxing authorities, and particularly the U.S., and Germany, who while not themselves considered tax havens or corporate tax havens, rank #2 and #7 respectively in the 2018 Financial Secrecy Index of tax secrecy jurisdictions:

Tax Cuts and Jobs Act

Impact

Before the passing of the TCJA in December 2017, the U.S. was one of eight remaining jurisdictions to run a "worldwide" taxation system, which was the principal obstacle to U.S. corporate tax reform, as it was not possible to differentiate between the source of income.  The seven other "worldwide" tax systems, are: Chile, Greece, Ireland, Israel, Korea, Mexico, and Poland.

Tax experts expect the anti-BEPS provisions of the TCJA's new hybrid "territorial" taxation system, the GILTI and BEAT tax regimes, to neutralize some Irish BEPS tools (e.g. the double Irish and the single malt). In addition, the TCJA's FDII tax regime makes U.S.–controlled  multinationals indifferent as to whether they charge-out their IP from the U.S. or from Ireland, as net effective tax rates on IP, under the FDII and GILTI regimes, are very similar. Post-TCJA, S&P500 IP–heavy U.S.–controlled multinationals, have guided 2019 tax rates that are similar, whether legally headquartered in Ireland or the U.S.

Tax academic, Mihir A. Desai, in a post-TCJA interview in the Harvard Business Review said that: "So, if you think about a lot of technology companies that are housed in Ireland and have massive operations there, they’re not going to maybe need those in the same way, and those can be relocated back to the U.S.

It is expected Washington will be less accommodating to U.S. multinationals using Irish BEPS tools and locating IP in tax havens. The EU Commission has also become less tolerant of U.S. multinational use of Irish BEPS tools, as evidenced by the €13 billion fine on Apple for Irish tax avoidance from 2004 to 2014. There is widespread unhappiness of Irish BEPS tools in Europe, even from other tax havens.

Technical issues

While the Washington and EU political compromises tolerating Ireland as a corporate tax haven may be eroding, tax experts point to various technical flaws in the TCJA which, if not resolved, may actually enhance Ireland as a U.S. corporate tax haven:

A June 2018 IMF country report on Ireland, while noting the significant exposure of Ireland's economy to U.S. corporates, concluded that the TCJA may not be as effective as Washington expects in addressing Ireland as a U.S. corporate tax haven. In writing its report, the IMF conducted confidential anonymous interviews with Irish corporate tax experts.

Some tax experts, noting Google and Microsoft's actions in 2018, assert these flaws in the TCJA are deliberate, and part of the U.S. Administration's original strategy to reduce aggregate effective global tax rates for U.S. multinationals to circa 10–15% (i.e. 21% on U.S. income, and 2.5% on non–U.S. income, via Irish BEPS tools).  There has been an increase in U.S. multinational use of Irish intangible capital allowances, and some tax experts believe that the next few years will see a boom in U.S. multinationals using the Irish "Green Jersey" BEPS tool and on-shoring their IP to Ireland (rather than the U.S.).

In this regard, it is possible that Ireland still has a long-term future as a U.S. corporate tax haven.

In February 2019, Brad Setser from the Council on Foreign Relations, wrote a New York Times article highlighting material issues with TCJA.

See also 

 Criticism of Google
 Criticism of Apple Inc.
 Criticism of Facebook
 Criticism of Microsoft
 Corporation tax in the Republic of Ireland
 Qualifying investor alternative investment fund (QIAIF) Irish tax-free vehicles
 Single malt arrangement IP-based BEPS tool
 Panama as a tax haven
 United States as a tax haven

Notes

Sources

Journals

The following are the most cited papers on "tax havens", as ranked on the IDEAS/RePEc database of economic papers, at the Federal Reserve Bank of St. Louis.

Papers marked with (‡) were also cited by the EU Commission's 2017 summary as the most important research on tax havens.

Books
(with at least 300 citations on Google Scholar)

References

External links
Tax Justice Network: Ireland Section
OECD Global Forum on Tax Transparency
Tax Havens: How Globalisation Really Works by Ronen Palen
Ireland is the world’s biggest corporate ‘tax haven’, say academics, Irish Times (13 June 2018)
Is Ireland a tax haven? European Parliament says yes, Irish Times (28 March 2019)
Ireland is a tax haven – and that's becoming controversial at home, Washington Post (25 April 2019)

Corporate tax avoidance
International taxation
Taxation in the Republic of Ireland
Offshore law firms
Offshore magic circle